Typhloperipatus is a genus of velvet worm in the family Peripatidae, containing the sole species Typhloperipatus williamsoni. It is the only species in the phylum found in South Asia. The species was discovered in northeastern India in 1911.

Discovery 
The species name was after Noel Williamson, a political officer at Sadiya who was murdered in 1911 along with Dr. J.D. Gregorson. The murders led to an expedition in the Abor region by the British government in India. Stanley Wells Kemp, then an assistant superintendent at the Indian Museum at Calcutta was a zoologist attached to this expedition. Three specimens were found on 29 December 1911 near the gorge of the Dihang River near Rotung. Although the nearest known velvet worm species, from Malaya, are typically found in dead wood, these were found mainly under large stones near the roots of trees. Subsequently some more specimens were found at the mouth of the Sireng stream and another specimen was found when the 32nd Sikkim Pioneers were working on the construction of a road between Upper Rotung and Rengin. It is the only South Asian species in the phylum.

Morphology 
This species is blind and has no eyes, an unusual trait for a velvet worm. The colour of the upperside is a deep umber brown with the tips of the antennae slightly paler brown. The papillae on the skin have pale tips and the underside is pale brown. Some individuals have a dark dorsal stripe. The inner jaw has a serrate edge. Females have 20 pairs of oncopods (legs); males usually have 19 pairs but can have 20 pairs. The oncopods have coxal glands, four complete and spiny pads and the feet have two papillae. The minimum number of oncopod pairs found in this species (19) is the lowest number recorded in any member of the family Peripatidae.

Although Kemp believed that the species was closer to neotropical forms than to Southeast Asian forms, modern studies place them close to Eoperipatus of Southeast Asia. Like Eoperipatus, Typhloperipatus exhibits lecithotrophic ovoviviparity; that is, mothers in both genera retain yolky eggs in their uteri.

References

External links 
 

Onychophorans of southeast Asia
Onychophoran genera
Blind onychophorans